Gene Hamilton is a professional mountain bike racer and a licensed USA Cycling Expert Coach. He is a three time medalist at the UCI World Masters Championships (Silver 2002, Bronze 1999 and 2006). In addition to coaching hundreds of mountain bikers from recreational athletes to top pros, his skills coaching has been featured in The New York Times and on The Discovery Channel.

External links
 Gene Hamilton's website

American mountain bikers
Living people
American male cyclists
Year of birth missing (living people)
Place of birth missing (living people)